Koleolepas is a genus of crustaceans belonging to the family Heteralepadidae.

The species of this genus are found in Southwestern Asia.

Species:

Koleolepas avis 
Koleolepas tinkeri 
Koleolepas willeyi

References

Barnacles
Maxillopoda genera